Badsha Miah (born 24 August 1970)  is a Bangladeshi Ha-du-du player who was part of the team that won the bronze medal at the 2006 Asian Games.

References

External links
 Men's Kabaddi Bronze

Living people
Bangladeshi kabaddi players
Place of birth missing (living people)
Asian Games medalists in kabaddi
Kabaddi players at the 1998 Asian Games
Kabaddi players at the 2002 Asian Games
Kabaddi players at the 2006 Asian Games
Asian Games silver medalists for Bangladesh
Asian Games bronze medalists for Bangladesh
Medalists at the 1998 Asian Games
Medalists at the 2002 Asian Games
Medalists at the 2006 Asian Games
Year of birth missing (living people)
People from Sylhet Division